Karolína Stuchlá (born 24 February 1994) is a Czech former professional tennis player.

On 12 September 2016, she reached her highest doubles rankings of world No. 97. In her career, she won 13 doubles titles on the ITF Women's Circuit.

Stuchlá made her WTA Tour main-draw debut at the 2015 Nürnberger Versicherungscup in the doubles draw, partnering Lenka Kunčíková. She played her last match on the pro circuit in February 2017.

ITF finals

Singles: 1 (runner-up)

Doubles: 24 (13 titles, 11 runner-ups)

External links
 
 

1994 births
Living people
Czech female tennis players
People from Děčín
Sportspeople from the Ústí nad Labem Region